Waddon Marsh tram stop is a stop on the Tramlink service serving the area between Waddon and Croydon in the London Borough of Croydon. It is close to the commercial areas of the Purley Way. The stop is overshadowed by the giant gasometer of Croydon Gas Works. There was previously a railway station about 100 metres north of this site called Waddon Marsh, though all that remains of the previous station is an access path still lined with streetlamps painted BR red.

Connections
London Buses routes 289 and 455 serve the tram stop.

References

Tramlink stops in the London Borough of Croydon
Railway stations in Great Britain opened in 2000